Cicadettana is a genus of cicada belonging to the tribe Cicadettini of the family Cicadidae. Until 2017, the included species were classified under the genus Cicadetta.  Cicadettana are small (12–20 mm body length), inconspicuous cicadas with high-pitched songs, and they are commonly found on grass or low shrubs.  One species (ramosi) is known from Hispaniola, while the rest are found in the United States east of the Rocky Mountain divide.  The type species of the genus is Cicadettana calliope calliope, originally designated as Cicada calliope Walker, 1850.  Their closest known relatives are found in Europe, eastern Asia, and Micronesia.

Species
 Cicadettana calliope
 C. c. calliope (Walker, 1850) – east of Rocky Mountain divide, excluding northern/northeastern states
 C. c. floridensis (Davis, 1920) – southeastern states
 Cicadettana camerona (Davis, 1920) – southern Texas (Cameron County)
 Cicadettana kansa (Davis, 1919) – central and southern Great Plains states
 Cicadettana ramosi (Sanborn, 2009) – Hispaniola
 Cicadettana texana (Davis, 1936) – south central Texas

References

Cicadettini
Cicadidae genera